Joseph Lawrence Pfeifer (February 6, 1892 – April 19, 1974) was an American physician and politician who served as a member of the United States House of Representatives for New York's 8th congressional district from 1935 to 1951.

Early life and education 
Born in Brooklyn, he attended St. Nicholas Parochial School, St. Leonard's Academy, and St. Francis College in Brooklyn. He graduated from Long Island College of Medicine in 1914 and was licensed to practice the same year.

Career 
He was a lecturer and author on surgical topics and during the World War I he served on the medical advisory board, instructing medical officers going overseas.

Tenure in Congress 
Pfeifer was elected as a Democrat to the Seventy-fourth and to the seven succeeding Congresses (January 3, 1935 – January 3, 1951).

A confidential 1943 analysis of the House Foreign Affairs Committee by Isaiah Berlin for the British Foreign, Commonwealth and Development Office stated that Pfeifer

Later career 
Pfeifer was an unsuccessful candidate for renomination in 1950 to the Eighty-second Congress and resumed the practice of medicine.

Personal life 
He retired and resided in Brooklyn, where he died in 1974; interment was in St. John's Cemetery, Middle Village.

References

1892 births
1974 deaths
Politicians from Brooklyn
St. Francis College alumni
Democratic Party members of the United States House of Representatives from New York (state)
Catholics from New York (state)
20th-century American politicians